Pooja Rani Bohra (born 17 March 1992) is an Indian middleweight boxer. She is two time Asian champion (2019,2021) She won the bronze medal at the 2014 Asian Games in the 75 kg category. She won the gold medal in South Asian Games 2016. She also won Silver (2012) and Bronze (2015) in Asian Championship 75 kg weight categories. She represented India at the Glasgow Commonwealth Games 2014 in the 75 kg category. In 2016, she failed to qualify for the Rio Olympics when she lost at the second round of the Women's World Boxing Championships in May 2016,She is 7 time National champion also  In 2020 She become first Indian to qualify for 2020 Summer Olympics.

Early life 
Pooja Rani Boora hails from Nimriwali village of Haryana state's Bhiwani district, considered to be the sport's cradle in India. It took her a year to find the courage to join the Hawa Singh Boxing Academy in her town, and kept it secret from her father, whom she knew would disapprove, when she did. She would hide her injuries from the sport so that her father would not find out, staying over at friend's houses while her wounds subsided.

Pooja had to fight against her father's dislike of the sport to be allowed to compete professionally for almost six months. In an interview, she mentions how her father would tell her that 'good children did not play boxing'. When her father found out about her boxing ambitions, he banned her from attending classes. Her coach Sanjay Kumar Sheoran had to plead with her family to allow her to compete. Even so, it took nearly six months to convince her parents to allow her to box professionally.

Her first major win came in 2009 defeating a leading Haryana boxer Preeti Beniwal in the state championships, she became a youth state champion and followed it up with a silver in the Youth Nationals in the 60kg category. Her family start supporting her and her father rewarded her with a bike.

In Diwali 2017, she burnt her hand, which kept her out for six months. Eager to make up for lost time, she hurried into training and sustained a shoulder injury. Her confidence dented, Rani felt it was better to switch to the 81kg category. In April 2019, she won the ASBC Asian Championship gold  by defeating China's Wang Lina.

Pooja also serves as an Income Tax inspector at the Haryana government.

Boxing career
Pooja won the National Youth Boxing Championship in 2009, after which she broke through to the national stage. She then won the silver medal at the Asian Boxing Championships 2012 and the Arafura Games held in Australia in 2012, making her one of the top contenders to qualify for the 2016 Olympics at Rio. However, she lost at the second round of the AIBA Women's World Boxing Championships in 2016 and thus failed to qualify for the Rio Olympics.

She also had the opportunity to represent India in the 2014 Commonwealth Games, but lost to famous English boxer Savannah Marshal 0–3 in the Round of 16. She also represented India at the 2018 AIBA Women's World Boxing Championship, where she made a first round exit.

References

Living people
1991 births
Indian women boxers
Boxers from Haryana
People from Bhiwani district
Asian Games bronze medalists for India
Asian Games medalists in boxing
Boxers at the 2014 Asian Games
Medalists at the 2014 Asian Games
Middleweight boxers
Boxers at the 2020 Summer Olympics
Olympic boxers of India
21st-century Indian women